Vliet is a Dutch term for a minor streaming water and may refer to:
Vliet (canal), a canal in South Holland, the Netherlands
Vliet, Utrecht, a hamlet in Utrecht, the Netherlands
Vliets, Kansas, a community in the United States

See also
Asopos de Vliet, a rowing club at Leiden University
Hanna van Vliet, a Dutch actress
Steenbergse Vliet, a canal in North Brabant, the Netherlands
Van Vliet, a common Dutch surname
Van der Vliet, a Dutch surname